Jack Woods may refer to:

Jack Woods (footballer) (1896 – ?), English professional footballer
Jack Woods (priest), Scottish priest